This is a list of Chinese national-type primary schools (or SJK (C) in short) in Malaysia, arranged according to states. As of June 2021, there are 1,302 Chinese primary schools with a total of 495,386 students. Details of every schools are listed according to states and federal territories.

Statistics

List
Details of every schools are listed in separate pages according to states and federal territories. There are currently no Chinese schools in Putrajaya.

See also
List of schools in Malaysia

Footnotes

References

Schools in Malaysia